Slip-ons are typically low, lace-less shoes. The style which is most commonly seen, known as a loafer or slippers in American culture, has a moccasin construction. One of the first designs was introduced in London by Wildsmith Shoes, called the Wildsmith Loafer. They began as casual shoes, but have increased in popularity to the point of being worn in America with business suits. Another design was introduced as Aurlandskoen (the Aurland Shoe) in Norway (early 20th century). They are worn in many situations in a variety of colors and designs, often featuring tassels on the front, or metal decorations (the 'Gucci' loafer).

A less casual, earlier type of slip-on is made with side goring (sometimes called a dress loafer). Made in the same shape as lace-up Oxfords, but lacking the laces, these shoes have elasticated inserts on the side which allow the shoe to be easily removed but remain snug when worn. This cut has its greatest popularity in Britain.

Loafers

History

A bespoke shoe company based in London that was established in 1847 developed the first loafer as a country house shoe for the landed gentry and the royal family. The "Wildsmith Loafer" made by Raymond Lewis Wildsmith of Wildsmith Shoes, was designed for King George VI as a casual house shoe. The shoe has subsequently been marketed and sold by other London shoe firms and dubbed "the Harrow".

Shoemaker Nils Gregoriusson Tveranger (1874–1953) in Aurland, Norway, introduced his first design around 1908. Tveranger obtained protection for the design. N. Tveranger obtained a diploma at the Bergen exhibition in 1910 for his "Aurland shoe". The first Aurland shoes were also made with laces and a decorative upper side similar to the brogue shoe. Colors were initially natural until approximately 1960 when they were also painted black. At age 13 Tveranger went to North America where he learned the craft of shoemaking and returned to Norway age 20. Around 1930, Tveranger introduced a new design called the "Aurland moccasin", later renamed the "Aurland shoe". This design resembles the moccasins used by the Iroquois as well as the design of moccasin-like shoes traditionally worn by locals in Aurland. These traditional shoes resembled slippers and were useful outdoor in fine weather. In 1936 the local shoe handcraft in Aurland was described as a "very old industry" and shoes were sold in large numbers to foreign visitors. A 1953 catalog listed about 10 shoe factories in the small village of Aurland. When exported the USA the Aurland shoes were called "Norwegian Moccasins". The Norwegians began exporting them to the rest of Europe, where they were taken up by visiting Americans, and championed by the American Esquire magazine. Some photographs included with the Esquire feature were of Norwegian farmers in a cattle loafing area.  The Spaulding family in New Hampshire started making shoes based on this design in the early 1930s, naming them loafers, a general term for slip-on shoes which is still in use in America. In 1934, G.H. Bass (a bootmaker in Wilton, Maine) started making loafers under the name Weejuns (sounding like Norwegians). The distinctive addition was a strip of leather across the saddle with a diamond cut-out. Initially only worn in the summer at home, the shoe grew in popularity in America to become a significant part of men's casual shoe wardrobe; in Europe the style has never reached the same degree of ubiquity.

The term penny loafer has uncertain beginnings. One explanation is when American prep school students in the 1950s, wishing to make a fashion statement, took to inserting a penny into the diamond-shaped slit on their Weejuns. Another theory is that two pennies could be slipped into the slit, enough money to make an emergency phone call in the 1930s. This, however, is an urban legend, as pay phone calls in the USA have never been less than five cents, nor have the pay phones ever accepted pennies. Either way, the name penny loafer came to be applied to this style of slip-on and has since stuck. The practice continues, especially among those who remain committed to a classic and refined but still scholarly appearance, such as lawyers.

In the mid-1950s, further continental influences brought a more elegant image to light, lower-cut slip-ons, which moved from purely casual use to being paired with suits in the 1960s (but still only in America).  In 1966, Italian designer Gucci made the further step of adding a metal strap across the front in the shape of a horse's snaffle bit.  These Gucci loafers (now a general term referring to shoes of this style by any manufacturer) also spread over the Atlantic and were worn by 1970s businessmen, becoming almost a Wall Street uniform, reaching widespread use by the 1980s.

At the start of the twenty-first century, a revival of penny loafers, whose popularity had peaked during the mid to late 1960s and again during the early 1980s to early 1990s, occurred, with the shoe appearing in a more rugged version, closer to the original concept, as either moccasins, or espadrilles, both of these styles being very low or flat without heels. This resurgence was most noticeable at college campuses across America.

Another variation on the basic style is the tassel loafer, which emerged in the 1950s. Again, though casual, their gradual acceptance among the American East Coast prep school culture as equivalent to brogues (wingtips), has led to them being worn there with suits, where they gained an association with business and legal classes.

Types of loafer

Use

In the United States and some European countries, such as Italy, the loafer enjoys general use as a casual and informal shoe worn for work and leisure, though lace-ups are still preferred for more formal situations. The general popularity of brown over black extends to loafers, sometimes using exotic leathers such as suede and cordovan. Since the early 1980s, socks have been optional while wearing loafers.

Though originally men's shoes, some styles of loafers, such as casual tassel and penny loafers, are also worn by women. Women's loafers tend to have shorter toes and are worn with a variety of outfits from shorts, jeans, slacks, and capris to dresses and skirts.

Gored shoes
In an evolution entirely different from the loafer, Chelsea boots were invented by J. Sparkes Hall for Queen Victoria in 1836. The stretchable rubber produces a comfortable shoe combining the convenience of laceless shoes with the profile of lace-ups. Its feminine image was soon lost, and was dubbed Congress gaiter and Boston boot in America. Rare even in Britain, its country of origin, it is still the only style of slip-on worn with a suit in some of the highly conservative working environments in the City of London. With such a background, their use mimics that of Oxfords, so they are worn in brown with broguing as a country shoe, or in plainer, black styles with suits.

See also
Slipper
Venetian-style shoe
List of shoe styles

References

Shoes

or:ଲୋଫର୍